Strickland Creek is a stream in both the municipality of Fauquier-Strickland and Unorganized North Cochrane District, Cochrane District in Northeastern Ontario, Canada. It is in the James Bay drainage basin and is a right tributary of Moonbeam Creek.

Course
The creek begins at an unnamed wetland in the municipality of Fauquier-Strickland and flows northeast, then turns north, and passes under Ontario Highway 11 and the Ontario Northland Railway just east of the community of Strickland. It continues north, flows into geographic Alexandra Township in Unorganized North Cochrane District, and reaches its mouth at Moonbeam Lake. The lake flows via Moonbeam Creek, the Poplar Rapids River, the Mattagami River and the Moose River to James Bay.

References

Rivers of Cochrane District